Kentucky's 4th congressional district is a congressional district in the U.S. state of Kentucky. Located in the northeastern portion of the state, it is a long district that follows the Ohio River. However, the district is dominated by its far western portion, comprising the eastern suburbs of Louisville and Northern Kentucky, the Kentucky side of the Cincinnati area.

The majority of voters live in the booming suburban Cincinnati counties of Boone, Kenton, and Campbell, which includes such suburbs as Fort Mitchell, Covington, Florence, Newport, and Fort Thomas.  The next-largest population center is the northeastern suburbs of Louisville. It stretches as far south as northern portions of the city of Bardstown.

The district is currently represented by Republican Thomas Massie, who was elected in a special election in 2012 to succeed Republican Geoff Davis, who resigned on July 31, 2012, citing family concerns.

Characteristics
The 4th was one of the first areas of Kentucky to turn Republican outside of traditionally Republican south-central Kentucky; it has been in GOP hands for all but six years since 1967.   Its politics are dominated by Republicans in the wealthy Cincinnati suburbs, which have swelled with former Cincinnati residents since the early 1960s. Between them, Boone, Kenton and Campbell counties have as many people as the rest of the district combined. As a measure of how much the Cincinnati suburbs have dominated the district, when Massie took office, he became the first congressman from the district's eastern portion in 45 years.  Nonetheless, Democrats still hold state and local offices in rural counties.

Until January 1, 2006, Kentucky did not track party affiliation for registered voters who were neither Democratic nor Republican. The Kentucky voter registration card does not explicitly list anything other than Democratic Party, Republican Party, or Other, with the "Other" option having a blank line and no instructions on how to register as something else.

Recent presidential elections

List of members representing the district

Recent election results

2002

2004

2006

2008

2010

2012

2014

2016

2018

2020

2022

See also

Kentucky's congressional districts
List of United States congressional districts

References

 Congressional Biographical Directory of the United States 1774–present

04
Boone County, Kentucky
Boyd County, Kentucky
Bracken County, Kentucky
Campbell County, Kentucky
Carroll County, Kentucky
Gallatin County, Kentucky
Grant County, Kentucky
Greenup County, Kentucky
Harrison County, Kentucky
Henry County, Kentucky
Jefferson County, Kentucky
Lewis County, Kentucky
Mason County, Kentucky
Oldham County, Kentucky
Owen County, Kentucky
Pendleton County, Kentucky
Shelby County, Kentucky
Spencer County, Kentucky
Trimble County, Kentucky
Constituencies established in 1803
1803 establishments in Kentucky
Constituencies disestablished in 1933
1933 disestablishments in Kentucky
Constituencies established in 1935
1935 establishments in Kentucky